Psalm 29 is the 29th psalm of the Book of Psalms, beginning in English in the King James Version: "Give unto the LORD, O ye mighty, give unto the LORD glory and strength". The Book of Psalms is part of the third section of the Hebrew Bible, and a book of the Christian Old Testament. In the slightly different numbering system used in the Greek Septuagint and Latin Vulgate translations of the Bible, this psalm is Psalm 28. In Latin, it is known as "Adferte Domino filii Dei". The psalm is attributed to David. It is a hymn, describing the advent of Yahweh in a storm.

The psalm forms a regular part of Jewish, Catholic, Lutheran, Anglican and Nonconformist Protestant liturgies.

Text

Hebrew Bible version
Following is the Hebrew text of Psalm 29:

King James Version
 Give unto the LORD, O ye mighty, give unto the LORD glory and strength.
 Give unto the LORD the glory due unto his name; worship the LORD in the beauty of holiness.
 The voice of the LORD is upon the waters: the God of glory thundereth: the LORD is upon many waters.
 The voice of the LORD is powerful; the voice of the LORD is full of majesty.
 The voice of the LORD breaketh the cedars; yea, the LORD breaketh the cedars of Lebanon.
 He maketh them also to skip like a calf; Lebanon and Sirion like a young unicorn.
 The voice of the LORD divideth the flames of fire.
 The voice of the LORD shaketh the wilderness; the LORD shaketh the wilderness of Kadesh.
 The voice of the LORD maketh the hinds to calve, and discovereth the forests: and in his temple doth every one speak of his glory.
 The LORD sitteth upon the flood; yea, the LORD sitteth King for ever.
 The LORD will give strength unto his people; the LORD will bless his people with peace.

Verse 2 
Give unto the Lord the glory due unto his name; worship the Lord in the beauty of holiness.
These words form the title of a hymn by Irish clergyman John Samuel Bewley Monsell. Alexander Kirkpatrick comments that

Theme 
Psalm 29 is "a hymn, describing the advent of Yahweh in a storm. (1) The angels worship Yahweh in the heavenly temple (v.1-2); (2) the thunder of Yahweh's voice is a great power (a) on the waters (v.3-4); (b) upon Lebanon and its cedars (v.5-6); (c) upon the wilderness and its forests (v.8-9); (3) Yahweh, enthroned over the Flood, reigns forever and bestows blessings on his people (v.10-11)."

According to Charles and Emilie Briggs, it "seems to belong to the Persian period subsequent to Nehemiah", that is, between 445 and 333 BCE.

Uses

Judaism 
Is the sixth paragraph of Kabbalat Shabbat.
Is recited on Shabbat during Shacharit as when returning the Torah Scroll to the ark.
Is recited in some congregations before Maariv on Motzei Shabbat. 
Is recited on the third day of Sukkot in some traditions.
Is recited on Shavuot in some traditions.
Verse 11 is part of Talmud Berachos 64a. It is the final verse of Birkat Hamazon, is recited during the prayers following Motzei Shabbat Maariv, and is recited when opening the Hakafot on Simchat Torah.

Book of Common Prayer 
In the Church of England's Book of Common Prayer, this psalm is appointed to be read on the evening of the fifth day of the month.

Musical settings 
Heinrich Schütz wrote a setting of a metric paraphrase of Psalm 28 in German, "Ich ruf zu dir, Herr Gott, mein Hort", SWV 125, for the Becker Psalter, published first in 1628.

References

External links 

 
 
  Mechon-mamre
 Text of Psalm 29 according to the 1928 Psalter
 A psalm of David. / Give to the LORD, you sons of God text and footnotes, usccb.org United States Conference of Catholic Bishops
 Psalm 25:1 introduction and text, biblestudytools.com
 Psalm 29 – The Voice of the LORD in the Storm enduringword.com
 Psalm 29 / Refrain: The Lord shall give his people the blessing of peace. Church of England
 Psalm 29 at biblegateway.com
 Hymns for Psalm 29 hymnary.org
 Recordings of three Hebrew tunes to the entire psalm

5th-century BC literature
4th-century BC literature
029
Works attributed to David